Sass Henno (born September 13, 1982 in Tartu, Estonia) is an Estonian writer.

He attended Miina Härma Secondary Grammar School in Tartu between 1989-2001. 2001-2003 he studied computer graphics and advertising in Tartu Art College, then film and video directing in the Tallinn University between 2003-2005. Since 2007 he has been attending a master’s level screenwriting course in Baltic Film and Media School.

He won the first prize in Estonian Novel Competition 2005 with his work Mina olin siin. Esimene arest. A feature-length film based on the novel was released in 2008 (I Was Here).

Henno worked in Estonian Television as an assistant and director. Since 2005 he has been a member of Estonian Writers' Union. Since 2010 he works as a CEO of Spring Advertising ad agency Royal Service event marketing agency.

Henno also enjoys reading, sailing and shooting (IPSC).

Bibliography 
 
 Elu algab täna (Life Starts Today e-book, 2003)
 Mina olin siin. Esimene arest  (I Was Here. The First Arrest; Eesti Päevaleht 2005) 
 Mereröövlimäng (Pirat Game; Troll 2005)
 Elu algab täna (Life Starts Today; Eesti Päevaleht 2006)
 Südameasjad (Matters of the Heart; shortfilm, Allfilm 2007)

Translations 
I Was Here. The First Arrest

 Macedonian: Jас бев тука, Skopje: Antolog 2014
 Hungarian: Itt jártam: az első letartóztatás, Budapest: Silenos 2010
 Latvian: Šeit biju es. Pirmais arests, Riga: Dienas Grāmata 2006

Pirate Game

 Russian: Игра в пиратов, Tallinn: Kite 2012

Awards 
2004 Writers’ Union Novel Competition, winner (I Was Here. The First Arrest)

References

 Toomas Haug, "Sass Henno, Robertino Loretti ja narkorealism" – Looming 2006, nr. 2, p. 300–304 (Sass Henno, Robertino Loretti and the narcorealism)
"Sass Henno" – Estonian Children's Literature Centre

1982 births
Living people
Estonian screenwriters
Estonian male novelists
Writers from Tartu
21st-century Estonian novelists
Miina Härma Gymnasium alumni
Tallinn University alumni
21st-century screenwriters